The 1991 Recopa Sudamericana was the third Recopa Sudamericana, an annual football match between the winners of the previous season's Copa Libertadores and Supercopa Sudamericana competitions. 

However, this edition was scratched and Olimpia of Paraguay were awarded the Recopa Sudamericana as the club won both the 1990 Copa Libertadores and 1990 Supercopa Sudamericana. 

Olimpia's feat of being crowned the champion of a competition without having played a match was unprecedented in the history of international football.

References 

Rec
Recopa Sudamericana
Recopa Sudamericana